Yeomans is an English surname meaning son of Yeoman. Guppy reported it from Derbyshire and Herefordshire. 

Notable people with the surname include:

 Solomon Yeomans Chesley (1796-1880), public servant and political figure in Canada West
 Amelia Yeomans (1842-1913), Canadian physician and suffragist
 Bill Yeomans (20th century), Australian rugby league player
 Frank Yeomans, object-relations author and training supervisor for transference focused psychotherapy
 Gael Yeomans (born 1988), Chilean politician and lawyer
 Harry Yeomans (1901–1965), English football goalkeeper 
 Hec Yeomans (1895–1968), Australian rules footballer
John Yeomans (writer) (1916–1995), Australian journalist and writer
 Kelly Yeomans (1984-1997), English school girl who committed suicide
 Lucy Yeomans (21st century), fashion magazine editor
 P. A. Yeomans (1904-1984), Australian inventor
 Julia Yeomans, British theoretical physicist
 John William Yeomans (1800–1863), Presbyterian pastor, and the second president of Lafayette College

See also
 Yeoman (disambiguation)
 2956 Yeomans, a main-belt asteroid

Footnotes

Surnames from status names